Torraca is a town and comune in the province of Salerno in the Campania region of south-western Italy.

History

The LED city
In 2007, the town spent 280,000 euro to convert all its 700 street lamps to LED technology - a first in Europe - and thereby reduced its energy and maintenance costs by 70%. Because of this, the town was awarded the Kyoto 2007 prize. Newspapers referred to Torraca as "LED city".

Geography
The town is situated in the south of Cilento, a few kilometers from Sapri and Maratea and close to the borders of Campania with Basilicata. The surrounding municipalities are Casaletto Spartano, Sapri, Tortorella and Vibonati.

References

External links

 Municipal website of Torraca

Cities and towns in Campania
Localities of Cilento